Nahum (Naum) Moiseyevich Korzhavin (real surname Mandel, ; 14 October 1925 – 22 June 2018) was a Russian poet of Jewish descent, a dissident and emigrant who moved to Boston, Massachusetts in 1973 and lived there 43 years. He spent the last two years of his life in Chapel Hill, North Carolina, to be near family.

Korzhavin was given the Big Book National Award-2006 for his contribution to literature. He was the only Big Book finalist to get into the short-list with a book of memoirs.

Korzhavin created a vivid detailed picture of his life and his country in his prose work under the expressive title In Temptations of the Bloody Epoch.

In 2005 Korzhavin participated in They Chose Freedom, a four-part television documentary on the history of the Soviet dissident movement.

References

External links
 Poet Naum Korzhavin, a Big Book Author

1925 births
2018 deaths
Writers from Boston
Writers from Kyiv
Pseudonymous writers
Russian male poets
Soviet emigrants to the United States
Soviet dissidents
Russian memoirists
Russian-language writers
Soviet Jews
Russian Jews
Maxim Gorky Literature Institute alumni